Francisco Asensi (1936-2013) was a Spanish writer. He was born in Algemesi and studied history at the University of Valencia. He served as a priest for a decade, between 1963 and 1973, but then abandoned the cloth to pursue a variety of careers. He wrote five books, mostly with a religio-historical bent.

References

Spanish writers
1936 births
2013 deaths
University of Valencia alumni